The following highways are numbered 884:

United States

Canada
 Alberta Highway 884